Serapion the Sindonite was a Christian monk from Egypt who is considered a saint by the Catholic Church.

Life

Serapion was an Egyptian monk who was noted for his severely ascetic practices. 
He lived at a time when monasticism was starting to flourish in the Egyptian wilderness. 
According to Alban Butler,

Notes

Sources

356 deaths
4th-century Christian saints